Toboggan is a portable roller coaster that was built by Chance Industries from 1969 to the mid-1970s.  The coaster features a small vehicle, holding two people, that climbs vertically inside a hollow steel tower then spirals back down around the same tower. There is a small section of track at the base of the tower with a few small dips and two turns to bring the ride vehicle back to the station. Each vehicle has a single rubber tire with a hydraulic clutch braking system that governs the speed of the vehicle as it descends the tower. The rubber tire engages a center rail that begins halfway through the first spiral. The ride stands 45 feet tall with a track length of 450 feet. A typical ride lasts approximately 70 seconds.

History
The coaster was invented by Walter House of Amarillo, Texas, and Chance acquired the manufacturing rights and started producing it in 1969. The coaster was designed to be a carnival ride, fitting on two trailers, but several units were purchased by amusement parks where they were set up as permanent attractions. When the ride was first offered in 1969 it had a price tag of $35,000. Chance built 32 of these units, two of which still operate at a permanent park. Many can also be found at carnivals all over the world.

Park installations
The following is a list of parks that are known to have operated a Chance Toboggan.

 Adventureland (New York)
 Aérocity Parc (France)
 Arnolds Park
 AstroWorld
 Boblo Island Amusement Park
 Clacton Pier
 Conneaut Lake Park (closed)
 Dog Patch USA (Arkansas)
 Enchanted Forest (Indiana)
 Grand Prix Amusements (Manitoba)
 Grand Strand Amusement Park (Myrtle Beach, South Carolina)
 Great Adventure Amusement Park (Flushing, N.Y.)
 Great Yarmouth Pleasure Beach
 Hersheypark (two) – composed of two identical Toboggan models, known as the Toboggans
 Jenkinson's Boardwalk
 Lakemont Park 
 Little Amerricka (still in operation)
 Old Chicago
 Parc Belmont
 Playland Park (Illinois)
 Santa's Village
 Shaheen's Fun-O-Rama Park (Mass.)
 Sportland Pier (N.J.)
 Stewart Beach Park (Texas)
 Trimper's Rides
 Xingqinggong Park (China)
 Magic Mountain -Merimbula-(Australia)

Traveling carnival providers
 Skerbeck Family Carnival (Escanaba, Michigan)

References

External links
 Listing of Chance Toboggan coasters at RCDB.com

Mass-produced roller coasters